The city of Poznań, the capital of Greater Poland Voivodeship, offers a variety of tourist attractions, including historical sights, monuments, museums, and theatres.

Skyline

Religious buildings

Parks

Monuments

Notable buildings

Neighbourhoods

See also

References

External links
 Sights in Poznań

 
Poznań
Poznań